Innerferrera is a village in the district of Hinterrhein in the Swiss canton of Graubünden. Previously an independent municipality, it merged on January 1, 2008 with neighboring Ausserferrera to form the municipality of Ferrera.

History
Innerferrera is first mentioned in 1556 as Canicül.

Geography

Of this, 22.9% is used for agricultural purposes, 11.7% is forested, 0.4% is settled (buildings or roads), and the remainder (65%) is non-productive (rivers, glaciers or mountains).

The municipality is located in the Schams sub-district, of the Hinterrhein district.  It is a haufendorf (an irregular, unplanned and quite closely packed village, built around a central square) on the Averser branch of the Rhine.  In 2008 Innerferrera merged with Ausserferrera to form Ferrera.

The dam of the Lago di Lei, in the Valle di Lei, is located on its territory.

Demographics
Innerferrera has a population of 038, of which 5.3% are foreign nationals.  Over the last 10 years the population has decreased at a rate of -35.6%.

, the gender distribution of the population was 60.5% male and 39.5% female.  The age distribution, in Innerferrera is; 9 people or 18.4% of the population are between 0 and 9 years old.  6 people or 12.2% are 10 to 14, and no one is 15 to 19.  Of the adult population, 2 people or 4.1% of the population are between 20 and 29 years old.  8 people or 16.3% are 30 to 39, 8 people or 16.3% are 40 to 49, and 6 people or 12.2% are 50 to 59.  The senior population distribution is 3 people or 6.1% of the population are between 60 and 69 years old, 3 people or 6.1% are 70 to 79, there are 4 people or 8.2% who are 80 to 89.

In the 2007 federal election the most popular party was the SVP which received 72.7% of the vote.  The next three most popular parties were the CVP (18.2%), the SPS (5.5%) and the FDP (3.6%).

The entire Swiss population is generally well educated.  In Innerferrera about 84% of the population (between age 25-64) have completed either non-mandatory upper secondary education or additional higher education (either University or a Fachhochschule).

Innerferrera has an unemployment rate of 0%.  , there were  people employed in the primary economic sector and about  businesses involved in this sector.  17 people are employed in the secondary sector and there is 1 business in this sector.  5 people are employed in the tertiary sector, with 2 businesses in this sector.

The historical population is given in the following table:

 Population increase due to construction of the dam at Valle di Lei

Languages
Most of the population speaks German (93.9%), with Romansh being second most common ( 4.1%) and English being third ( 2.0%).

Weather
Innerferrera has an average of 118.2 days of rain per year and on average receives  of precipitation. During this month there is precipitation for an average of 12.2 days. The month with the most days of precipitation is May, with an average of 13.3, but with only  of precipitation.

References

External links

Ferrera
Villages in Graubünden
Former municipalities of Graubünden